Tariq Hameed Karra (born 28 June 1955) is an Indian politician and was a member of parliament to the 16th Lok Sabha from Srinagar (Lok Sabha constituency), Jammu and Kashmir. He had won the 2014 Indian general election being a Jammu & Kashmir Peoples Democratic Party candidate by defeating Dr. Farooq Abdullah of National Conference by more than 40000 votes, and thereby handing the veteran politician his first ever electoral defeat in 4 decades. He was a fierce critic of the BJP-PDP alliance from the very beginning and resigned from the Lok Sabha and PDP, of which he was a founding member as a mark of protest against innocent civilian killings in September 2016 and later joined the Indian National Congress in February 2017 and was later nominated as a member of Congress Working Committee, the first for any politician from Kashmir valley. He has also served as the Finance, Planning and Law minister for Jammu and Kashmir state.

References

|-

Further reading
 R. S. Gull, Man of the Match, Kashmir Life, 26 May 2014.
 Mudashir Ahmad, Why the Resignation of the PDP’s Srinagar MP is a Big Deal, The Wire, 16 September 2016.
 V. Kumaraswamy, 'The seeds of Kashmiri discontent and alienation were sown when the PDP allied with the BJP', The Telegraph, 25 September 2016.
 Anil Anand, Karra’s Congress-plan for Kashmir, Daily Excelsior, 3 January 2017.

K
Politicians from Srinagar
Living people
Lok Sabha members from Jammu and Kashmir
1955 births
Jammu and Kashmir Peoples Democratic Party politicians